The Thirty may refer to:

David's Mighty Warriors, the retinue of the Biblical king David
Thirty Tyrants, the Athenian oligarchy beginning in 404 BC
Trial of the thirty, trial of anarchists in the Third French Republic
The Thirty (Drenai Series), series of books by David Gemmell
Thirty, a novel by Howard Vincent O'Brien recently made available on Project Gutenberg
 Thirty (album), a 2013 album by Australian recording artist Anthony Callea

See also
30 (disambiguation)